Supralathosea obtusa is a species of mossy sallow in the moth family Noctuidae.

The MONA or Hodges number for Supralathosea obtusa is 10189.

References

Further reading

 
 
 

Amphipyrinae
Articles created by Qbugbot
Moths described in 1909